Kota Ranger Football Club (abbrev: KRFC), formerly Perkota, is a Bruneian football club, playing in the Brunei Super League. It was formed in 1978 and was successful in the late eighties and early nineties, winning the national championships twice. Kota Ranger directly translates to City Ranger in English. 

Having won two national championship playoffs, a competition that pitted the four district champions against one another; in 1987 and 1993, Kota Ranger is regarded as one of the most successful clubs from that era. Kota Ranger FC, a dominant force in Brunei football in the 1980s and 1990s, and AM Gunners FC are two club names that may hint at some British influence on the local game.

History

Early days 
In the 1970s, Perkota was created by Alidon Laidin and his siblings of Kota Batu on the outskirts of Bandar Seri Begawan, overlooking the Brunei Bay. Before focusing on football and changing their name to Kota Ranger FC in 1978, the main sports were perahu racing, badminton, and sepak takraw. This was a result of their accepting players from outside the Kota Batu region as well. They participated in the national championships run by the Brunei Football Association and claimed silverware first in 1987, then secondly in a league championship in 1992. 

Regionally, they participated in the 1987 Asian Club Championship and the 1992 Borneo Inter-Club Cup, winning the latter outright. A penalty scored by Momin Ahmad on the 22nd minute of the match between Kota Ranger and Persiba Balikpapan, brought the club to victory. They failed to qualify for the 1992–93 edition of the Asian Club Championship, despite having beaten PKNK F.C. from Malaysia in the first round. A few national players, including Liew Chuan Fue and Rosanan Samak of the 1999 Malaysia Cup team, were from Kota Ranger.

Decline 
Kota Ranger was one of the founding clubs of the B-League in 2002. They were relegated after being in the last place with only one win during the 2004 Premier League, and spent time in the second tier of Brunei football until 2015, when they became league champions and promoted to the Brunei Super League. Norsillmy Taha scored the winning penalty which resulted in a 1–0 victory over Tabuan Muda.

Revival 
Currently their best record in the competition is in the 2017–18 season when they finished runners-up to MS ABDB. In 2019, Kota Ranger claimed their first ever FA Cup triumph, beating MS PDB 2–1, the winner coming in the 89th minute via a Nur Asyraffahmi Norsamri free-kick after Amir Bujang for the policemen cancelled out an earlier Amalul Said goal. During the 2020 Super Cup, the club went as far as winning the final match 3-1 against MS ABDB at the Hassanal Bolkiah National Stadium. Adi Said's debut followed by him scoring a hat-trick; on the 3rd, 44th and 90th minutes of the match.

The club was leading 1st place in the 2020 Super League when it was unexpectedly postponed and eventually cancelled due to the ongoing COVID-19 pandemic in the country, ending the tournament with only two matches completed. That following year, the restrictions were lifted and the club would participate in the 2022 FA Cup, Kota Ranger made it into the semi finals of the 2022 FA Cup after winning against KB FC in the quarter finals. However, they would be defeated by DPMM FC with an aggregated score of 3–0.

Current squad

Club officials

Honours 
 Brunei Premier League
 Champions (1): 2015
 Brunei Super League
 Runners-up (1): 2017–2018
 National Championship play-off
 Champions (2): 1987, 1993
 Brunei FA Cup
 Champions (1): 2018–2019
 Runners-up (1): 2003
 Piala Sumbangsih
 Champions (1): 2020
 Brunei National Championship
 Champions (1): 1987
 Jasra Trophy League
 Champions (1): 1988–89
 BAFA-Standard Chartered Football League
 Champions (1): 1992
 Borneo Inter-Club Cup
 Champions (1): 1992
 Joint Cup Championship
 Champions (1): 2019

References

Football in Brunei
Football clubs in Brunei
Association football clubs established in 1978
1978 establishments in Brunei